The 1978–79 season of the Moroccan Throne Cup was the 23rd edition of the competition.

Wydad Athletic Club won the cup, beating Chabab Mohammédia 2–1 in the final, played at the stade Mohammed V in Casablanca. Wydad Athletic Club won the cup for the third time in their history.

Tournament

Last 16

Quarter-finals

Semi-finals

Final 
The final took place between the two winning semi-finalists, Wydad Athletic Club and Chabab Mohammédia, on 9 September 1979 at the Stade Mohammed V in Casablanca.

Notes and references 

1978
1978 in association football
1979 in association football
1978–79 in Moroccan football